The following is a list of winners of the Golden Calf for best photography at the NFF. This category has been awarded since 2003
 2022 Martijn van Broekhuizen - Narcosis
 2021 Lennert Hillege - The Forgotten Battle
 2020 Myrthe Mosterman - Goud
 2019 Jasper Wolf - Open Seas
 2018 Lennert Hillege - Beyond Words
 2017 Rogier Stoffers - Brimstone
 2016 Frank van den Eeden - Full Contact
 2015 Mark van Aller - Son of Mine
 2014 Tibor Dingelstad - Helium
 2013 Richard van Oosterhout - &ME
 2012 Goert Giltay - The Girl and Death
 2011 Jasper Wolf - Code Blue
 2010 Lennert Hillege - R U There
 2009 Daniël Bouquet - Nothing Personal
 2008 Menno Westendorp - In Real Life
 2007 Richard van Oosterhout - Wolfsbergen
 2006 Thomas Doebele & Maarten Schmidt - Constant, Avant Le Départ
 2005 Melle van Essen - Echoes Of War
 2004 Erik van Empel - The Last Victory
 2003 Bert Pot - Phileine Zegt Sorry

Sources
 Golden Calf Awards (Dutch)
 NFF Website

Best Camera
Awards for best cinematography